Powhatan High School is a public high school in Powhatan County, Virginia. It serves 1412 students and is the only high school in they Powhatan County Public Schools school system.

History 
Powhatan High School was held in a number of different buildings in the 1900s; the building used from 1971 to 2003 was later used as Pocahontas Middle School from 2003 to 2016, now called Pocahontas Landmark Center and used as the school board office. The school was racially integrated in 1969. The current facility opened in 2003.

Academics
PHS ranks among the top 6,600 high schools in America, top 145 in Virginia, and 18th in the Richmond Metro Area. The graduation rate is 95%.

Advanced Placement (AP) classes are offered at Powhatan High School, with 41% of students taking AP classes. PHS also offers Dual enrollment classes in collaboration with J. Sargeant Reynold's Community College. Powhatan High School also has an Advanced College Academy program with this school. Students in this program can earn an associate's degree in social sciences and an advanced studies high school diploma when they graduate. 

AP Classes include: AP English 11 (Language & Composition), AP English 12 (Literature & Composition), AP Calculus A/B, AP Statistics, AP Computer Science Principles, AP Computer Science, AP Environmental Science, AP Biology, AP Chemistry, AP Physics I, AP Human Geography, AP Modern World History, AP US History, AP US Government & Politics, AP Psychology, AP Spanish, AP Music Theory, and AP Economics. 

Dual Enrollment classes for students who are not enrolled in the ACA program: DE Math Analysis (Math 167), DE English 12 (English 111, 112), and DE US Government (PLS 135, 136).

PHS offers Career and technical education classes that provide students with experience in various job fields including: Veterinary Science, Business Marketing, Information Technology, Carpentry, Electricity, Culinary Arts, Cosmetology, Engineering, JROTC, Firefighting, Education, and Medical Sciences. Along with these CTE classes, Powhatan High School offers Cooperative Education Programs which let students work at an approved job and earn high school credit for that work.

Extra Curriculars 

 Mu Alpha Theta (Math Honor Society)
 National English Honor Society
 Science National Honor Society
 Tri-M Music Honor Society
 Spanish Honor Society
 Rho Kappa (Social Studies Honor Society)
 FBLA-PBL
 FFA
 SkillsUSA
 Indoor Drumline
 Marching band

Performing Arts 
Powhatan High School operates multiple curricular ensembles including Show choir, Symphonic band, Wind symphony, Jazz band, and Chamber Orchestra. 

In 2023, the schools show choir "Radiance" received grand champion in their division at the New England Show Choir Showdown at Andover High School in Massachusetts. 

In 2022, the school district was awarded with the Best Communities for Music Education designation from the NAMM foundation.

Athletics
Powhatan Highschool's athletic teams are named the "Indians" and they compete in the Virginia High School League's Dominion District. The teams competed in the Jefferson District until 2019. 

The Indians football team won state championships in 1996 and 2003. 

The softball team has six state championships, and the baseball team won its first state championship in 2007.

References

External links
 Powhatan High School
 

Schools in Powhatan County, Virginia
Public high schools in Virginia